Nevada State Museum may refer to:

Nevada State Museum, Carson City
Nevada State Museum, Las Vegas